Annie Walker may refer to:

 Annie E. A. Walker (1855–1929), American artist
 Annie Louisa Walker (1836–1907), English Canadian teacher and author
 Annie Purcell Sedgwick (1871–1950), later Annie Walker, Scottish chemist
 Annie Walker (Coronation Street), a character from the British television series Coronation Street
 Annie Walker, a main character from the American television series Covert Affairs

See also 
 Anne Walker (disambiguation)